Raúl Alberto Speroni (born March 8, 1986 in Buenos Aires) is an Argentine footballer who played in the Venezuelan Primera División for Zamora and Carabobo.

Notes

External links
Profile at Strategicfootballsports.com

1986 births
Living people
Argentine footballers
Club Atlético Vélez Sarsfield footballers
Estudiantes de La Plata footballers
Arsenal de Sarandí footballers
Carabobo F.C. players
CS Minerul Motru players
FC Bihor Oradea players
Expatriate footballers in Venezuela
Argentine expatriate sportspeople in Spain
Expatriate footballers in Romania
Association football midfielders
Zamora FC players
Argentine expatriate footballers
Footballers from Buenos Aires